See No Evil is a collection of works of public art by multiple graffiti artists, located around Nelson Street in Bristol, UK. The artwork was first created in an event in August 2011 that was Europe's largest street art festival at the time. It culminated with a block party. The street was mostly repainted in a repeat event in 2012. The artworks comprise murals of various sizes, in different styles, some painted on tower blocks, including a 10-storey office block. The works were created under a road closure, using scaffolding and aerial work platforms.

See No Evil 2011 
See No Evil 2011, was a week-long graffiti art event, that claimed to be the largest street art event of its kind in the UK, reaffirmed Bristol's high position in the UK's urban art movement, and supports the claim, that Bristol may be the current international center of this urban art movement. The city has a well established and thriving urban art scene, with many walls around the city decorated over the years by artistic graffiti, notably around the Stokes Croft area, often by local but international respected urban artists like Inkie and Banksy. "Urban and street art are widely felt to be an important part of the city's creative DNA" (Bennet). The event was organised by respected Bristol street artist Inkie (Tom Bingle) who emerged (like Banksy) out of Bristol's 1980s graffiti scene. Inkie said that the inspiration for the event arose partly from witnessing similarly grand street art projects in Lisbon and Melbourne: "I thought it was about time Bristol, home of urban art in the UK had an installation of this scale." "Nothing of this size and scale has ever taken place in the UK and it's an event that has captured the minds of some the world's most respected street artists. It's a major coupé that we've managed to pull this off in Bristol."

The event was coordinated by Inkie, along with Mike Bennett - Bristol City Council, Bristol based music promoter Team Love (made up of music producers Dave Harvey and Tom Payne) and Sam Brandt, director of Weapon of Choice Gallery. The Council contributed  to the project, on the assumption of attracting tourists, with place-making director Mike Bennett paying for half of the project through his salary. The  was to be matched by private donations. The organizers spent a year planning the project, with full support from the street's residents, businesses and building owners. Team Love (TL) organised the music festival and street party.

Before 20 August 2011, the chosen location, Nelson Street, was "one of the most depressing, ugly and run down streets in Bristol" (Mike Bennet). A dreary '1960's urban nightmare. Decaying and decrepit' (Inkie). "Bristol's Nelson Street was nothing but empty shells of grey buildings built by tasteless architects that stank of piss," a nondescript corridor of bleak, grey buildings between Broadmead and Colston Square in the city centre "It needs something big development-wise.... with the economy as it is, the prospect of any serious development here in the next five years is almost nonexistent."  A spokesperson of one of the buildings said "anything that would revitalise the street and increase footfall for a minimal cost – then all the better."

The council viewed the project as a platform to revitalize the street and encourage its regeneration.  The councils Executive member for culture Simon Cook said: "This project is very exciting for Bristol. ...this will put us on the map internationally" as a cultural and tourist attraction. Two years previously Banksy show at the City Museum and Art Gallery had attracted large crowds. The organisers also looked towards Melbourne, Australia, were a street project attracted almost half a million visitors a year as an example of how street art could help regenerate urban area.

The name 'See No Evil', Bennett explained, is from the three wise monkeys who see no evil, hear no evil and speak no evil. "It sort of works on the artistic element, and because it has a musical element to it as well. And of course because we're taking over the old magistrates' courts" and Police station. The irony of Inkie being invited to paint the very courts he was sentenced in after Operation Anderson years before, as the ringleader of 75 plus artists in the UK's largest graffiti-related arrest, was not lost. "Half the early graffiti artists in Bristol must have been taken to that police station or through the magistrates' courts at one time or another" . "I mean, we've legally painted the old juvenile and magistrates' courts where a few of these artists have been processed and charged. It was quite a surreal thing to see."

List of 2011 See No Evil artists 
A total of 72 graffiti artists were invited to take part, including twenty of the world's leading artists. Writing in The Independent, Louisa McGillicuddy noted that only two of the artists were women.

Sources for the table below unless otherwise stated.

Other Artists included: Kid Acne, Swanski, Ben Slow, Best Ever, Bonzai, Cosmo Sarsen, Dicey, Feek, GMC, Hit + Run, Maumau, Mr Wany, Mysterious Al, Pinky, Ponk, SEPR, Wow 123, Xenz, Zeus, Solo One, and Goldie

Who's Lenny? 
A 16-minute long short film about See No Evil 2011, Who's Lenny?, was commissioned by the council. It was produced by Bristol-based production company Hurricane Media. The film was made using a range of techniques including wirecam technology – a first in a UK urban environment - as well as time-lapse photography and 24-hour live coverage.

See No Evil: Who's Lenny explains how once outlawed graffiti artists have now come to critical acclaim, and how one group in particular were invited to paint the courts of law in which they were once convicted for their art. The video aims to present street art as a vibrant and contemporary art form. The documentary includes interviews with some of the 72 artists involved including Inkie, Tats Cru, El Mac, Nick Walker, Shoe, Xenz, China Mike and Paris. Focusing on the See No Evil event, the film also explores how street art has a natural home in Bristol, capturing the spirit of Bristol graffiti scene.

The film went on to win Royal Television Society (RTS) Awards for Best Short Film and Best Community Media in February 2012.

See No Evil 2012 
Arrangements were made by Inkie for the repainting of the street in August 2012, as part of the 2012 Cultural Olympiad accompanying the Summer Olympics and Paralympics, with support from Bristol City Council, the Arts Council and London 2012 Festival as part of the 2012 Cultural Olympiad and Bristol University. See No Evil 2012 began on 13 August when 45 selected (both local and international) artists, with 3,500 cans of spray paint and 700 litres of paint.

The event took place on Nelson Street again, a one-way bus and taxi lane known for its depressingly grey concrete walls (including a 12-story office block and a police station) over the course of 7 days– with the permission of the owners. Three works from the 2011 event's 72 pieces were saved by the public vote, via an internet poll allowing people to voice their opinions on preferred works, those being the suited man pouring a tin of red paint, the wolf boy, and the woman and child; painted by Nick Walker, Aryz and El Mac respectively.

It is intended that See No Evil at Nelson Street will remain Europe's largest open air street art gallery, with huge murals until the following summer. Some of the artists (including ManOne and Vyal One, FLX One and Dones and Limited Press) in the same week also created work on hoardings around the Bristol Temple Quarter Enterprise Zone.

List of 2012 See No Evil artists 
Sources unless otherwise stated.

Hear No Evil 
Both years, alongside the live art event of See No Evil with graffiti artists at work, Hear No Evil hosted live music and DJ sets with artists from Bristol's music scene, plus graffiti workshops, food stalls, breakdancing, face painting, and pop-up galleries. For both years there were music events in the disused Westgate Building. Both years had a Hear no Evil block party on the final Saturday and in 2012 Busking day on Sunday 19 August. For 2012 the opening event was an audio-visual immersive event, "Mail, Maps & Motion", on Friday 17 August, featured a collaboration of Joanie Lemercier (from 3D projection people AntiVJ) and musicians Adrian Utley of Portishead and Will Gregory of Goldfrapp, took place at the Passenger Shed.

Reception and future 
Some Conservative councillors said that the exhibition was a waste of money and were unhappy the Liberal Democrat-run council had contributed towards funding it.

Bristol City Council Leader Barbara Janke said:  "When the economy is suffering generally, it is important for councils to take steps like these to stimulate the city's economy. ..This daring and entrepreneurial project has acted as a catalyst for change in this once unloved part of the city centre. ..."Bristol is leading the way by promoting one aspect of the city's own unique character to a much wider audience to generate wider economic benefits."

Jonathan Jones writing in The Guardian about the 2011 event concluded that street art was dying.  "Maybe there was a time when painting a wittily satirical or cheekily rude picture or comment on a wall was genuinely disruptive and shocking. That time is gone" and went on to say, "Images far too ordinary to be exhibited in art galleries are admired because they are on the street".

2012, Nelson Street business woman, Lynne Tonks, said it was "the best thing that they ever did in this street...They've increased the foot flow," with more tourists were attracted to the area, less crime and vandalism.  "It's a pleasanter environment to work in and for people to come to," Ms Tonks said. "Graffiti is something that Bristol should be proud of, Banksy's put it on the map and other people are following - and it looks great."

See No Evil 2011 not only successfully rejuvenated a very run down area of Bristol but generated enough publicity to turn it into one of Bristol's biggest tourist attractions. When asked about the legacy of See No Evil, Dave Harvey from Team Love said "In terms of legacy – obviously the street itself. This street this time last year, no one came here, there was nothing on the street, it was really grey and dismal. This year council figures show tens of thousands more people are coming down here every month to look at the art."

Inkie said "The future of See No Evil is a more diverse base of art forms including photography, digital and animation with bigger music acts and better installations and street dressings. This is something we would like to take on tour to other cities across the globe. The legacy is the longstanding effect on the youth and their creativity in Bristol through the outreach projects and workshops in which we are directly inspiring the youth and showing them ways to express themselves. This will lead in turn to a bigger creative scene in Bristol for the future."

See also
Quinta do Mocho murals, near Lisbon, Portugal

References

External links 
 
 Telegraph 2011 Review

Graffiti in England
Murals in the United Kingdom
Arts in Bristol
2011 paintings
2010s murals
Street art festivals